The 1970 Iowa State Cyclones football team represented Iowa State University in the Big Eight Conference during the 1970 NCAA University Division football season. In their third year under head coach Johnny Majors, the Cyclones compiled a 5–6 record (1–6 against conference opponents), finished in last place in the conference, and were outscored by opponents by a combined total of 284 to 248. They played their home games at Clyde Williams Field in Ames, Iowa.

Tony Washington and Mark Withrow were the team captains.

Schedule

Personnel
 WR Otto Stowe, Sr.

References

Iowa State
Iowa State Cyclones football seasons
Iowa State Cyclones football